Muddy Boggy Creek,  also known as the Muddy Boggy River, is a  river in south central Oklahoma. The stream headwaters arise just east of Ada in Pontotoc County. It is a major tributary of the Red River in south central Oklahoma. Clear Boggy Creek is a major tributary which enters the Muddy Boggy at a location known as River Mile 24 in Choctaw County.  The river is inhabited by over one hundred species of fish.

Geography
Muddy Boggy Creek is located in the counties of Pontotoc, Hughes, Coal,  Atoka, and Choctaw.

It begins on the eastern edge of Ada, and comes within  of the Canadian River before turning southeast and passing through the Arkoma Basin and the western edge of the Ouachita Mountains.  It is located in an area once known as the Cross Timbers. It joins the Red River at a point southwest of Hugo, just a few miles upriver from where Highway 271 crosses the Red River at the unincorporated town of Arthur City, Texas.

Lake Atoka is the only lake on the river.

Tributaries
Tributaries of Muddy Boggy Creek include Sand, Caney Boggy, Rock, East Fork, Coal, Caney (Coon), North Boggy, McGee, Cold Spring, Lick and Crowder creeks. Major tributaries of Clear Boggy Creek are Jackfork, Coal, Goose, Leader, Delaware, Sandy, Caney, Fronterhouse, Cowpen, Bois d'Arc and Mayhew creeks. According to Pigg, all of the tributaries in the headwaters are short and deep, while those in the lower elevations are short, shallow and filled with dead timber.

Topography
By the time it flows through the Cretaceous area, the gradient is only . It then flows through the Ouachita Mountains.

Clear Boggy Creek has a gradient of about  near its source and  near its mouth.

Watershed

History

Name origin
Muriel H. Wright wrote that Doctor Jonathan Sibley had reported in 1805, that this stream had been called Vazzures by French explorers. She said this was a corruption of the French word vaseaux, which meant boggy or "miry", because of the deep mud or mire in the channel bottom. Later, English-speaking traders named the stream, using the English translation.

Historical significance 
Muddy Boggy Creek was in territorial days considered a particularly defining characteristic, as there were no bridges and the waterway's sandy banks made it difficult to ford.  The Pushmataha District, one of three administrative super-regions comprising the Choctaw Nation in the Indian Territory, used it or its tributaries to form boundaries between Atoka County, Jack's Fork County, Jackson County and Kiamitia County.  The District's administrative and judicial capital, Mayhew, was said to be positioned "between the forks of the Boggies," a frequent early-day reference to the lower reaches of the river in the plural form.

Notes

References

External links
Hydrology Prediction for Muddy Boggy Creek
Oklahoma Digital Maps: Digital Collections of Oklahoma and Indian Territory

Rivers of Oklahoma
Rivers of Hughes County, Oklahoma
Rivers of Pontotoc County, Oklahoma
Rivers of Coal County, Oklahoma
Rivers of Atoka County, Oklahoma
Rivers of Choctaw County, Oklahoma
Tributaries of the Red River of the South